Kagelestan-e Bar Aftab (also Romanized as Kāgelestān-e Bar Āftāb; also known as Kakolstan-e Baraftab) is a village in Pishkuh-e Zalaqi Rural District, Besharat District, Aligudarz County, Lorestan Province, Iran. At the 2006 census, its population was 43, in 7 families.

References 

Towns and villages in Aligudarz County